The Rover 200 Coupé is a two-door coupé that was produced by Rover and based on the Rover 200 Mark II, with most of the body panels and the bumpers unique in the range. The car was launched on 6 October 1992, at the Paris Motor Show. It was given the project code name 'Tomcat' when in development.

When introduced, the range flagship, the 220 Turbo Coupé, was the most powerful and fastest production Rover model ever built.

The range was revised in 1996, with new engines, and was renamed Rover Coupé. Production ceased in 1998.

Styling
The Rover 200 Coupé was equipped with a specially shaped split glass roof system with a central T-Bar. The twin panels could be tilted or detached independently, and the bar itself could also be removed and stored in the boot in a special protective cover. The glass was an advanced, semi reflective material, coated with titanium. Transmission of solar heat was restricted to only six per cent, eliminating the need for a sun blind.

The lines of the 200 Coupé resulted from a completely new monoside and front and rear roof panels, new front and rear bumpers and a deep front spoiler extension with large intake grille.

The interior was designed to accommodate four people, with rear seats individually styled. With the application of burr walnut veneer and quality fabrics, the interior was in the Rover traditions of elegance and refinement. Optional leather trim was also available. The Rover 200 Coupé featured infra red remote central door locking as standard. It also saw the application of ultrasonic alarm system developed originally for the Rover 800 range, giving both perimetric and volumetric protection.

Rover 200 Coupé (1992–1995)
A specially developed version of the established 'Torsen' torque sensing traction control system previously only applied to four wheel drive and some rear wheel drive vehicles (Maserati Biturbo), was developed to help optimise handling. It was standard on the 220 Turbo Coupé, and optional for the first year of production on the naturally aspirated 220 version. Critics at the time reported that the handling was marred by the power being rather clumsily transmitted through the front wheels. As a result, the handling dynamics fell short of its rivals.

At launch, three engine types gave the Coupé a broad appeal: a Honda D-Series 1.6-litre engine , and two Rover 2.0 T-Series engines; a naturally aspirated version producing  and a turbo version . All versions had manual transmission as standard, with an automatic option only with the 1.6 version.

In 1994, changes were introduced to the 200 Coupé range, most obviously with a chrome grille being added to bring in line with the rest of the 200 series. Cost saving changes were also seen, such as a reduction in the amount of leather used, ignition barrel light removed and dash light dimming deleted. The alarm system received several changes to keep up with current security requirements.

Ash Grey was the standard trim colour on all derivatives, but the optional full leather trim set could be specified in either Ash Grey or Sand Stone Beige. Exterior colours initially were: White Diamond, Flame Red, Black, Quicksilver Metallic, Nordic Blue Metallic, Polynesian Turquoise Metallic, Nightfire Red Pearlescent and Tahiti Blue Pearlescent (a new colour exclusive to the Coupé, later introduced to other cars in the Rover range). In 1994, Nordic Blue and Quicksilver were replaced with British Racing Green, Platinum Silver and Charcoal. Black, pearlescent or metallic paint were optional on all models.

216 Coupé

The 1.6-litre model was designed to appeal to the cost conscious Coupé buyer. Excessive stock of the 216 Coupé led Rover to bring out a new model, the 216 SE, prior to the new 1996 range was launched. This was dressed up with the rear body coloured spoiler and front fog lamps, aimed to generate additional sales to clear the way for the new models.

Positive centre feel power steering
Ventilated front disc brakes
15" 7 spoke alloy road wheels with 185/55 VR tyres
Locking wheel nuts
Infra-red remote central door locking
Comprehensive alarm system with engine immobilisation
Two-piece glass sunroof with T Bar
Sports style seats with lumbar adjustment for both front seats
Electronic 3-band stereo radio/cassette with four speakers
Roof mounted radio aerial
Electric front windows
50/50 split folding rear seat backrest
Height adjustable steering wheel
Tinted glass

Options included:

4 speed automatic transmission with torque lock-up
Anti-lock braking system (including rear disc braking)
ICE upgrade including 6 disc CD changer and RDS
Full leather trim set
Driver seat height adjustment
Air conditioning

220 Coupé

This model featured the T series 2.0 litre 16 valve engine, later introduced into the rest of the 200/400 range in 1993. It replaced the M16 unit used in previous models. The 220 Coupé was priced at £16,670.

Over the 216 Coupé, the 220 featured: 
Rear disc brakes
Anti lock braking system
Front fog lamps
R750 RDS ICE
Leather seat borders
Boot mounted body coloured spoiler

Options included:
'TorSen' differential gearbox (deleted from option after first year of production)
ICE upgrade including 6 disc CD changer
Full leather trim set
Driver seat height adjustment
Air conditioning

220 Coupé Turbo
The flagship of the range, the 220 Coupé Turbo's performance came from the T-Series 2.0 litre 16 valve engine with turbocharging producing  at 6000 rpm and  The fastest ever production Rover achieved  and a 0 to 60 mph time of 6.2 seconds and 30 to 70 mph in 5.7 seconds in a test by Autocar in October 1992.

Torsen torque sensing traction control, uprated suspension and anti lock brakes as standard. The differential is a completely mechanical device so by most manufacturer's standards this would not have been considered to be a 'Traction Control System'. However, the LSD was the reason why the Rover was marketed as having traction control. Anti lock braking (ABS) was standard on the 2.0 litre models. The car was priced at £18,315. Features of the Rover 220 Coupé Turbo over the naturally aspirated 220 included:

Michelin Pilot tyres 195/55 on 15" six spoke 'Turbo' alloy road wheels
Leather trimmed steering wheel and gear knob
Turbo designation on rear appliqué panel

Options included:

ICE upgrade including six disc CD changer
Full leather trim set
Driver seat height adjustment
CFC free air conditioning

Rover Coupé (1996–1998)
In 1996, Rover announced revisions to the Coupé, with the range also losing the 200 model name. Two, all new, models were introduced to replace the previous models. The Coupé 1.6 was now fitted with Rover Group's own K-Series 16 valve double overhead camshaft power unit instead of the previous Honda unit. The 2.0 and Turbo models were replaced by the 1.8 VVC Coupe.

Inside, the interior was completely revamped and featured the new rounder dash as fitted to the newer shape Rover 200. The alarm system on all models was again changed and now featured Thatcham approval. The interior trim was lightened from the dark Ash Grey to a lighter Picadilly Grey. The 1.6 was fitted with cloth trim in either red or grey centres whilst the VVC came with the leather side bolsters as seen in previous models. All three models had the option of full smokestone leather.

Exterior paint could be specified in seven colours, including one all new colour: Flame Red, Charcoal, Platinum, British Racing Green, Tahiti Blue, Nightfire Red and Amaranth. Near the end of production, Diamond White again became available and another new colour, Anthracite was also available, although this is exceptionally rare.

In 1998, Rover Group ceased production of the Coupé, bringing the R8 range to an end. The Rover Coupé body shape was never revamped, to bring into line with the new shape 200 and 400.

Coupe 1.6

The SE model ensured it continued into the new range and again featured a body coloured rear spoiler and front fog lamps over the standard 216 Coupé. The K-Series 1.6-litre engine produced the same  as the previous Honda engine and could reach the same speed. The automatic transmission was again available for the 216 and 216 SE Coupé models only. The 1.6 was fitted with steel wheels with plastic trims or could be specified with a cost option six spoke 'turbo' alloy wheels. The SE came with an all new five spoke alloy wheels.

Coupé 1.8 VVC
Launched to replace the 220 and Turbo, the VVC Coupé used Rover Group's K-Series engine with the addition of variable valve control as used in MG F. The VVC produced , reached  and a 0-60 mph time of 7.8 seconds, significantly slower than the previous Turbo model.

Export versions
The 200 Coupé was sold throughout Europe, Japan and in New Zealand. The 216 Coupé sold outside the United Kingdom home market came fitted with double over head camshaft Honda power unit, rather than the single over head camshaft unit fitted to the cars for the United Kingdom. A batch of approximately 330 220 Coupé Turbo models were exported to Japan in 1995.

Rover 200 Coupé Racing Series
In 1993, Rover Group produced 36 specifically modified 200 Coupé Turbo models. The cars were not undersealed and were seam welded and fully race prepared. The code name Tomcat from the project days was used to create a new race series, the Dunlop Rover Tomcat Race Series. The cars competed against each other around the United Kingdom & Europe for two years until Rover dropped their backing.

The series was renamed the Stafford Landrover Super Coupé Cup and the cars continued to battle it out against each other. Many of the cars are still in existence and some still compete competitively against similar cars that have fallen fate of the end of single make series racing.

References

External links
 The Rover Coupe Owners Club
Rover 200 & 400 Owner's Club
Rovertech MG Rover Technical Forums

200 Coupe
Front-wheel-drive vehicles
Coupés
Cars introduced in 1992